Metroxylon is a genus of monoecious flowering plants in the Arecaceae (palm) family, and commonly called the sago palms consisting of seven species. They are native to Western Samoa, New Guinea, the Solomon Islands, the Moluccas, the Carolines and Fiji in a variety of habitats, and cultivated westward to Thailand and Malaya.

The name is a combination of two Greek words:  meaning "womb", commonly translated as "heart" in this context, and  meaning "wood", in allusion to the large proportion of pith contained in the plant.

Description
The trunks of Metroxylon species are solitary or clumped and large to massive in size, and usually sprout aerial roots at leaf-scar rings.  All but one is monocarpic (hapaxanthic), foliage is pinnate with oversized petioles and leaf sheaths.  The petioles are distinguished by "groups of small black spines resembling the record made by a seismograph as it registers a mild tremor". All species have spines on the rachis and petiole. The monocarpic species present a Christmas tree shaped inflorescence, or instead, upward-reaching branches spreading horizontally. These panicles are second only to Corypha spp in size, in the case of Metroxylon salomonense growing up to thirty feet (nine meters) in height by up to fifteen feet (4.5 meters) in width.  The fruit, covered in tough shiny scales, are relatively large for palms and contain one seed.

Extant species
It contains the following species

References

 
Arecaceae genera
Flora of Oceania
Taxonomy articles created by Polbot